Baraha kalan is a village in Udaipura tehsil of Raisen district in Madhya Pradesh, India. The primarily spoken language is Bundeli.

Villages in Raisen district